Vagif Rza Ibrahimov (born May 9, 1947, in the village of Jahri) is an Azerbaijani mathematician and professor. He is a corresponding member of ANAS and an organizer and a participant of numerous conferences. He has published more than 102 articles abroad. He is a professor at Baku State University.

References

External links 
 Biography at the Official website of the Baku State University
 Biography at the Official website of Institute of Control Systems

20th-century Azerbaijani mathematicians
1947 births
Living people
21st-century Azerbaijani mathematicians